Kushk (also Romanized as Kūshk; also known as Kooshk va Ma’dan Kooshk, and Kūseh) is a village in Kushk Rural District of the Central District of Bafq County, Yazd province, Iran. At the 2006 National Census, its population was 167 in 62 households. The following census in 2011 counted 343 people in 107 households. The latest census in 2016 showed a population of 139 people in 49 households; it was the largest village in its rural district.

References 

Bafq County

Populated places in Yazd Province

Populated places in Bafq County